Oncideres tuberculata is a species of beetle in the family Cerambycidae. It was described by James Thomson in 1868. It is known from Guyana and French Guiana.

References

tuberculata
Beetles described in 1868